Aequipecten acanthodes, the thistle scallop, is a species of bivalve mollusc in the family Pectinidae. It can be found in Caribbean waters, ranging from southern Florida to Bermuda.

References

Pectinidae
Bivalves described in 1825